Henry George Mallett (2 December 1914 – 12 June 1992) was an Australian rules footballer who played with Essendon in the Victorian Football League (VFL).

Notes

External links 

Harry Mallett's playing statistics from The VFA Project
World War Two service record for Harry Mallett

1914 births
1992 deaths
Australian rules footballers from Victoria (Australia)
Essendon Football Club players
Sandringham Football Club players